Don Galo, also historically known as Dongalo (and erroneously as Longalo and Tungalo), is an administrative division in southern Metro Manila, the Philippines. It is a barangay in the city of Parañaque along the north bank of the Parañaque River by its mouth in Manila Bay. It is located directly west of the village of Santo Niño (former Ibayo), separated from it by the Estero de Tripa de Gallina stream, and between Tambo to the north and the Parañaque poblacion of La Huerta to the south. The barangay also includes the southernmost section of Bay City, including portions of the Asia World subdistrict such as Entertainment City and Marina Bay.

Don Galo is home to the Parañaque Fisherman's Wharf, also known as the Bulungan Market, a wholesale coastal fish market where fish catch are sold to the highest bidder by "whispering" of prices. It is also the location of a Taoist temple known as the Kiu Pat Liong Shiao Temple, a prominent landmark along the Manila–Cavite Expressway. As of the 2015 census, it had a population of 11,645.

History
The village was originally known as Santa Monica, and was named for the barrio's patroness whose image is enshrined in the Santa Monica chapel on Santa Monica Street originally built in the 17th century. It takes its present name from a local hero of the Red Sea incident during the 1574 Battle of Manila, so named for the blood of invaders that spilled on it on November 30, 1574. The man, known simply as Galo, was said to have led his barrio folks in a successful effort to stop the advance of invading forces led by the Chinese pirate Limahong. The man was knighted by the Spanish colonial government in Manila for his heroism and was granted the title of "Don" after leading his barrio folks against the pirates.

From a traditional fishing village occupying a narrow strip of land on an estuary leading to Manila Bay, Don Galo now covers a total land area of  through land reclamation in the 1970s and 1980s. The Asia World subdistrict, part of the Boulevard 2000 project initiated by the Philippine Reclamation Authority in 1977, added  of land to Parañaque now shared between Don Galo and Tambo. The Manila–Cavite Expressway, also built on reclaimed land in the foreshore area of Don Galo, Tambo, La Huerta and San Dionisio, was opened in 1985. The national government appropriated  of these reclaimed lands in Don Galo for socialized housing in 2005.

A monument commemorating the 1574 Battle of Manila with the statues of Don Galo and Limahong was unveiled at Don Galo Park in 2012.

Education

The village is home to the following institutions:
 Don Galo Elementary School
 God's Heritage Christian Academy
 Parañaque National High School (Don Galo Annex)

Transportation

Don Galo is traversed by Elpidio Quirino Avenue on its eastern section which serves as its main street connecting it to La Huerta to the south via the Don Galo–La Huerta Bridge over the Parañaque River and Tambo and Baclaran to the north. Along its western section runs the Manila–Cavite Expressway where Manila Light Rail Transit System Line 1 extension is under construction. The village is connected to its Bay City extension via a narrow road crossing under the Manila–Cavite Expressway called Enrique Factoran Road. It connects to Pacific Avenue which serves as the main east–west street of Marina Bay village and which is also linked to the expressway via a flyover interchange constructed in 2018. Macapagal Boulevard starts at its junction with Pacific Avenue and links Don Galo to the Mall of Asia complex in Pasay.

The Asia World station of LRT Line 1 will serve Don Galo and the adjacent Asia World subdistrict of Bay City once completed and will be located on the east service road (Tambo Service Road) of the Manila Cavite Expressway. The village is also the location of the Parañaque Integrated Terminal Exchange, a major intercity and provincial bus terminal that replaced the Southwest Integrated Terminal in Tambo.

References

Barangays of Metro Manila
Parañaque